Radio P3 may refer to:

DR P3, Danish radio station
NRK P3, Norwegian radio station
NRK P3 Pyro, Norwegian internet-based music radio station
Sveriges Radio P3, Swedish radio station

See also
P3 (disambiguation)